Florida's 53rd House District elects one member of the Florida House of Representatives. Its current representative is Randy Fine. The district currently covers the southern portion of Brevard County.

Representatives from 1967 to the present

See also 
 List of members of the Florida House of Representatives from Brevard County, Florida

References

53
Brevard County, Florida